Laurent Witz is a Luxembourgian film maker. Witz and fellow producer Alexandre Espigares won an Academy Award for Best Animated Short Film for the 2013 film Mr Hublot at the 86th Academy Awards.

Decorations 
 Chevalier of the Order of Arts and Letters (2016)

References

External links
 

Luxembourgian film producers
Directors of Best Animated Short Academy Award winners
Living people
Year of birth missing (living people)
Place of birth missing (living people)
Chevaliers of the Ordre des Arts et des Lettres